Kol-e Sorkh Yeydi (also Romanized as Kol-e Sorkh Yeydī; also known as Gol-e Sorkh) is a village in Tarhan-e Sharqi Rural District, Tarhan District, Kuhdasht County, Lorestan Province, Iran. At the 2006 census, its population was 352, in 70 families.

References 

Towns and villages in Kuhdasht County